Diacylglycerol kinase delta is an enzyme that in humans is encoded by the DGKD gene.

This gene encodes a cytoplasmic enzyme that phosphorylates diacylglycerol to produce phosphatidic acid. Diacylglycerol and phosphatidic acid are two lipids that act as second messengers in signaling cascades. Their cellular concentrations are regulated by the encoded protein, and so it is thought to play an important role in cellular signal transduction. Alternative splicing results in two transcript variants encoding different isoforms.

References

Further reading